Córdoba is one of the eight constituencies represented in the Parliament of Andalusia, the regional legislature of the Autonomous Community of Andalusia. The constituency currently elects 12 deputies. Its boundaries correspond to those of the Spanish province of Córdoba. The electoral system uses the D'Hondt method and a closed-list proportional representation, with a minimum threshold of three percent.

Electoral system
The constituency was created as per the Statute of Autonomy for Andalusia of 1981 and was first contested in the 1982 regional election. The Statute provided for the eight provinces in Andalusia—Almería, Cádiz, Córdoba, Granada, Huelva, Jaén, Málaga and Seville—to be established as multi-member districts in the Parliament of Andalusia, with this regulation being maintained under the 1986 regional electoral law. Each constituency is entitled to an initial minimum of eight seats, with the remaining 45 being distributed in proportion to their populations (provided that the number of seats in each province did not exceed two times that of any other). The exception was the 1982 election, when each constituency was allocated a fixed number of seats: 11 for Almería, 15 for Cádiz, 13 for Córdoba, 13 for Granada, 11 for Huelva, 13 for Jaén, 15 for Málaga and 18 for Seville.

Voting is on the basis of universal suffrage, which comprises all nationals over eighteen, registered in Andalusia and in full enjoyment of their political rights. Amendments to the electoral law in 2011 required for Andalusians abroad to apply for voting before being permitted to vote, a system known as "begged" or expat vote. Seats are elected using the D'Hondt method and a closed list proportional representation, with an electoral threshold of three percent of valid votes—which includes blank ballots—being applied in each constituency. The use of the D'Hondt method may result in a higher effective threshold, depending on the district magnitude.

The electoral law allows for parties and federations registered in the interior ministry, coalitions and groupings of electors to present lists of candidates. Parties and federations intending to form a coalition ahead of an election are required to inform the relevant Electoral Commission within ten days of the election call—fifteen before 1985—whereas groupings of electors need to secure the signature of at least one percent of the electorate in the constituencies for which they seek election—one-thousandth of the electorate, with a compulsory minimum of 500 signatures, until 1985—disallowing electors from signing for more than one list of candidates.

Deputies

Elections

2022 regional election

2018 regional election

2015 regional election

2012 regional election

2008 regional election

2004 regional election

2000 regional election

1996 regional election

1994 regional election

1990 regional election

1986 regional election

1982 regional election

References

Parliament of Andalusia constituencies
Province of Córdoba (Spain)
Constituencies established in 1982
1982 establishments in Spain